Not.fay (born Nour Alessandra Fahmy) is a Swiss-Egyptian R&B artist. In 2017, not.fay released her debut EP Purple. Since 2017, she has been releasing singles regularly, unattached to a project. Not.fay has opened for Yizzy and was planned to open for Bhad Bhabie in Jordan before the concert was cancelled.

Personal life 
Not.fay was born in Switzerland to an Egyptian father and a Swiss mother. During her adolescence, not.fay lived in Jordan and then moved to the UK. She is currently based in Oakland, California.

Career 
In 2018, not.fay placed number 27 in the UK Music Week charts. In 2019, she was selected by public vote to open for popular UK music festival called Strawberries & Creem. She was also set to open for Bhad Bhabie's concert in Jordan before the show itself was cancelled because Bhad Bhabie had made controversial comments.

Additional links 

 not.fay on Instagram
 not.fay on Twitter

References 

21st-century Swiss women singers